Ulises Ciccioli
(born 2 July 2003)  is an Argentinian footballer who plays as a full-back for Rosario Central and the Argentina national under-20 football team.

Early life
Although born in Rosario, Ciccioli grew up living in Bombal, Santa Fe Province. He was born to parents Enzo and Silvia and had older brothers named Mariano and Leonel. He played locally for Sportivo Bombal as a striker. He was training with the Rosario Central first team by the age of 17 and his position on the pitch adapted.

Career
Ciccioli made his league debut for Rosario Central on the 5 November 2021 against Defensa y Justicia. He signed his first contract with the club towards the end of that season keeping him with the club until December 2024.

International career
He was named in the Argentina under-20 squad by Javier Mascherano for the 2023 South American U-20 Championship held in Colombia in January and February 2023. Previously, he had scored for the side in a 1-1 draw with the Brazilian under-20 team in September 2022.

References

External links

2003 births
Living people
Argentine footballers
Association football defenders
Argentine Primera División players
Argentina youth international footballers